Charłub  is a village in the administrative district of Gmina Książ Wielkopolski, within Śrem County, Greater Poland Voivodeship, in west-central Poland. The village has a population of 86.

Location

References

Villages in Śrem County